Dak Jamal (also Romanized as Dak Jamāl) is a village in Kahnuk Rural District, Irandegan District, Khash County, Sistan and Baluchestan Province, Iran. Its population in 2006 was 29, in 5 families.

References 

Populated places in Khash County